Jiang Yuande was a Chinese diplomat. He was Ambassador of the People's Republic of China to Cape Verde (1996–1999), Angola (1999–2002) and Brazil (2002–2006).

References

Ambassadors of China to Cape Verde
Ambassadors of China to Angola
Ambassadors of China to Brazil
Living people
Year of birth missing (living people)